Rongel Reef ( 'rif ron-'zhel),  is a moraine reef in the Emona Anchorage in the eastern parts of Livingston Island in the South Shetland Islands, Antarctica.  The reef emerged during a glacier retreat in the late 20th and early 21st centuries.

The feature is named after the Brazilian Navy ship Ary Rongel, in recognition of her logistic support for the Bulgarian Antarctic programme.

Location

See also 
 Composite Antarctic Gazetteer
 List of Antarctic islands south of 60° S
 SCAR
 Territorial claims in Antarctica

Maps
 L.L. Ivanov. Livingston Island: Central-Eastern Region. Scale 1:25000 topographic map.  Sofia: Antarctic Place-names Commission of Bulgaria, 1996.
 L.L. Ivanov et al. Antarctica: Livingston Island and Greenwich Island, South Shetland Islands. Scale 1:100000 topographic map. Sofia: Antarctic Place-names Commission of Bulgaria, 2005.
 L.L. Ivanov. Antarctica: Livingston Island and Greenwich, Robert, Snow and Smith Islands. Scale 1:120000 topographic map.  Troyan: Manfred Wörner Foundation, 2009.

References

External links
 Rongel Reef. SCAR Composite Antarctic Gazetteer
 Bulgarian Antarctic Gazetteer. Antarctic Place-names Commission. (details in Bulgarian, basic data in English)

External links
 Rongel Reef. Copernix satellite image

Landforms of Livingston Island
Reefs of Antarctica